Cheilodipterus arabicus is a species of ray-finned fish from the cardinalfish family Apogonidae. It is found in the western Indian Ocean and the Red Sea where it is relatively common, occurring in small shoals living in association with reefs.

References

Fish described in 1789
arabicus
Taxa named by Johann Friedrich Gmelin